Robert Fry Engle III (born November 10, 1942) is an American economist and statistician. He won the 2003 Nobel Memorial Prize in Economic Sciences, sharing the award with Clive Granger, "for methods of analyzing economic time series with time-varying volatility (ARCH)".

Biography
Engle was born in Syracuse, New York into Quaker family and went on to graduate from Williams College with a BS in physics. He earned an MS in physics and a PhD in economics, both from Cornell University in 1966 and 1969 respectively. After completing his PhD, Engle became an economics professor at the Massachusetts Institute of Technology from 1969 to 1977. He joined the faculty of the University of California, San Diego (UCSD) in 1975, wherefrom he retired in 2003. He now holds positions of Professor Emeritus and Research Professor at UCSD. He currently teaches at New York University, Stern School of Business where he is the Michael Armellino professor in Management of Financial Services. At New York University, Engle teaches for the Master of Science in Risk Management Program for Executives, which is offered in partnership with the Amsterdam Institute of Finance.

Engle's most important contribution was his path-breaking discovery of a method for analyzing unpredictable movements in financial market prices and interest rates. Accurate characterization and prediction of these volatile movements are essential for quantifying and effectively managing risk. For example, risk measurement plays a key role in pricing options and financial derivatives. Previous researchers had either assumed constant volatility or had used simple devices to approximate it. Engle developed new statistical models of volatility that captured the tendency of stock prices and other financial variables to move between high volatility and low volatility periods ("Autoregressive Conditional Heteroskedasticity: ARCH"). These statistical models have become essential tools of modern arbitrage pricing theory and practice.

Engle was the central founder and director of NYU-Stern's Volatility Institute which publishes weekly date on systemic risk across countries on its V-LAB site.

More recently, Engle (and Eric Ghysels) co-founded the Society for Financial Econometrics (SoFiE).

In 2022, he replaced Former secretary of state John Kerry as chairman of the climate finance partners advisory board, which is the non discretionary sub advisor to the KraneShares Global Carbon ETF or KRBN, one of the largest carbon allowance funds globally.

Personal life
 Paternal GrandfatherRobert Fry Engle, Sr. (b. 1879 d. 1946)
 FatherRobert Fry Engle, Jr. (b. 1910 d. 1981, DuPont chemist)
 MotherMary Starr Engle ("Murry", French teacher, m. 1939)
 SisterPatricia Lee Engle ("Patty", twin, UNICEF official)
 SisterSally Engle Merry (anthropologist, twin)
 WifeMarianne Eger Engle (psychologist, m. 10-Aug-1969, two children)
 DaughterLindsey Engle Richland (psychologist)
 SonJordan Engle (actor, b. May-1980)
 Mother-in-lawEdith Eger (psychologist, b. 29-Sept-1927)

Selected works

See also
 Modeling and analysis of financial markets

References

External links
 V-Lab: real time financial volatility and correlation measurements, modeling and forecasting
 The Society for Financial Econometrics (SoFiE)
 
 
 

Economists from New York (state)
American Nobel laureates
Cornell University alumni
Fellows of the American Statistical Association
Fellows of the Econometric Society
Fellows of the American Academy of Arts and Sciences
MIT School of Humanities, Arts, and Social Sciences faculty
Members of the United States National Academy of Sciences
New York University Stern School of Business faculty
Nobel laureates in Economics
Time series econometricians
University of California, San Diego faculty
Williams College alumni
American Quakers
People from Syracuse, New York
1942 births
Living people
20th-century American economists
20th-century Quakers
National Bureau of Economic Research
Mathematicians from New York (state)
Economists from California
21st-century American economists